Philothamnus semivariegatus, commonly known as the spotted bush snake is a species of non-venomous colubrid snake, endemic to Africa.

Geographic range
P. semivariegatus is distributed from South Africa northward to Sudan, Uganda and from Guinea eastward to Tanzania and sited at Nigeria.

Description
The colour is bright green with black speckles.

Biology
Spotted bush snakes are mostly found in trees in bush and forest areas, where they hunt lizards and treefrogs. They are excellent climbers and swimmers, have very good eyesight, and are highly alert snakes. They are not territorial, and will roam great distances in search for food. Spotted bush snakes are very common and completely harmless. They are well camouflaged, naturally very nervous, and quick to escape from any potential threat. As such, suburban sightings are rare.

In captivity
They can be very difficult to keep in captivity, being very nervous and reluctant to feed on anything but sympatric gecko species, but they are occasionally kept and bred successfully.

Reproduction

References

 Branch, Bill. 1988. Field Guide to the Snakes and other Reptiles of Southern Africa. .

Further reading
Branch, Bill. 2004. Field Guide to Snakes and Other Reptiles of Southern Africa. Sanibel Island, Florida: Ralph Curtis Books. 399 pp. . (Philothamnus semivariegatus, pp. 93–94 + Plates 30, 99).
Smith, Andrew. 1840. Illustrations of the Zoology of South Africa ... London: Lords Commissioners of Her Majesty's Treasury. (Smith, Elder and Co., printers). (Dendrophis semivariegata, Plates LIX, LX, LXIV, Figure 1).

Colubrids
Reptiles of Africa
Reptiles described in 1840